This is a list of viceroys of Antigua and Barbuda, from its initial colonisation in 1632 until its independence in 1981.

Between 1671 and 1816, Antigua was part of the British Leeward Islands and its viceroy was the Governor of the Leeward Islands.  The colony of the Leeward Islands was split in two in 1816, and the Governor of Antigua became the viceroy in Antigua, Barbuda and Montserrat.  In 1833 the British Leeward Islands were reformed, and the Governor of Antigua represented the monarch in all of the British Leeward Islands until 1872, when he became the Governor of the new federal colony of the Leeward Islands.

In 1956 the federal colony of the Leeward Islands was abolished, but the office of Governor of the Leeward Islands remained in existence until the end of 1959.  Antigua's government continued under an Administrator, subordinated to the Governor of the Leeward Islands until 1960.  The office of Administrator was retitled as Governor in 1967 when the colony attained the status of an associated state.

Governors of Antigua (1632–1671) 
 Sir Thomas Warner, 1632–1635
 Edward Warner, 1635–1639
 Rowland Thompson, 1639–1640
 Henry Ashton, 1640–1652
 Christopher Keynell, 1652–1660
 John Bunckley, 1661–1664
 Robert Carden, 1665–November 1666
 Robert le Fichot des Friches, sieur de Clodoré, November 1666, (French occupation)
 Quest, November 1666–9 November 1666, (French occupation)
 Daniel Fitche (or Fish), 1666–1667?
 Henry Willoughby, 1667–1670
 Samuel Winthrop, 1668–1671 eldest son of Governor John Winthrop of Massachusetts

Lieutenant Governors of Antigua (1671–1747) 
In 1671, Antigua became part of the newly formed colony of the Leeward Islands, whose governor remained on Antigua.  Until 1747, a lieutenant governor was appointed on Antigua to oversee domestic affairs.

 Philip Warner, 1671–1675
 Rowland Williams, 1675–1678, first time
 James Vaughan, 1678–1680
 Valentine Russell, 1680–1682
 Paul Lee, 1682–1683
 Edward Powell, 1683–1688
 Rowland Williams, 1689–1692, second time
 John Parry, 1692
 Vacant, 1692–1698
 John Yeamans, 1698–1711
 John Hamilton, 1709 <Oliver, 3:320>
 Edward Byam, 1711 December 1741
 Nathaniel Crump, 1735 <Oliver, 3:320>
 George Lucas 1742–1743
 Josiah Martin, 1743-1748

Vacancy(1747–1816)
From 1747 to 1816, there was no governor in Antigua, as they were administered as part of the British Leeward Islands.

Governors of Antigua (1816–1872)
In 1816, the British Leeward Islands was dissolved, and a new governor was appointed in Antigua.
 George William Ramsay, 1816–1819
 Sir Benjamin d'Urban, 1819–1826
 Sir Patrick Ross, 1826–1832
 Evan John Murray MacGregor, 1832–1833, acting
From 1833, the Governor of Antigua was viceroy in the colony of the British Leeward Islands:
 Evan John Murray MacGregor, 1833–1836, continued, acting to 1834
 Sir William MacBean George Colebrooke, 1837–1842
 Sir Charles Augustus Fitzroy, 1842–1846
 James Macaulay Higginson, 1847–1850
 Robert James Mackintosh, 1850–1855
 Ker Baillie Hamilton, 1855–1863
 Sir Stephen John Hill, 1863–1868
 Sir Benjamin Chilley Campbell Pine, 1868–1872
In 1872, the Governor of Antigua became the Governor of the Leeward Islands.

Administrators of Antigua (1936–1966)
 Hubert Eugène Bader, 1936
 James Dundas Harford, 1936–1941
 Herbert Boon, 1941–1944
 F. S. Harcourt, 1944–1946
 Leslie Stuart Greening, 1946–1947
 Richard St. John Ormerod Wayne, 1947–1954
 Alec Lovelace, 1954–1958
 Ian Turbott, 1958–1964
 David James Gardiner Rose, 1964–1966

Governors of Antigua (1967–1981)
 Sir Wilfred Jacobs, 1967–1981

In 1981 the associated state of Antigua became independent as Antigua and Barbuda. For a list of viceroys after independence, see List of Governors-General of Antigua and Barbuda.

See also

History of Antigua and Barbuda

References
 http://www.rulers.org/rula2.html#antigua_and_barbuda
 http://www.worldstatesmen.org/Antigua_and_Barbuda.html

Antigua and Barbuda
British Antigua and Barbuda people
Antigua
List